The Pagan Spirit Gathering (PSG) is one of the United States's oldest and largest nature spirituality festivals, organized by Circle Sanctuary. Since its inception in 1980, it has been held from Sunday to Sunday during the week around the summer solstice. This gathering is set up to represent a temporary Pagan town.

At first, the festivals were held in Richland County, Wisconsin, but it outgrew the facilities and in 1997 moved to a location near Athens, Ohio, at Wisteria. In 2009, PSG moved to Camp Zoe near Salem, Missouri, then in 2011, to Stonehouse Farm near Earlville, Illinois. After a flash flood caused PSG 2015 to close early, PSG moved to Tall Tree Lake near Vienna, Illinois.

The gathering was on hiatus in 2020 and virtual in 2021 as the COVID-19 pandemic caused its cancellation.

References

External links 
 Pagan Spirit Gathering

Modern paganism in the United States
Modern pagan festivals
1980s in modern paganism